Steadfast Benjamin (German:Der standhafte Benjamin) is a 1917 German silent comedy film directed by Robert Wiene and starring Arnold Rieck, Guido Herzfeld and Martha Altenberg.

Plot
After inheriting a large sum of money, a shoe store worker has to continue in his job due to his ten-year contract, but lives the high life each night.

Cast
 Arnold Rieck 
 Guido Herzfeld 
 Magda Madeleine   
 Agda Nilsson  
 Emil Rameau

References

Further reading
 Jung, Uli & Schatzberg, Walter. Beyond Caligari: The Films of Robert Wiene. Berghahn Books, 1999.

External links

1917 films
Films of the German Empire
German silent feature films
German comedy films
Films directed by Robert Wiene
German black-and-white films
1917 comedy films
Silent comedy films
1910s German films